The Ruby in the Smoke (1985) is a novel by the English author Philip Pullman. This book went on to win the 1987 Lancashire Children's Book of the Year Award. It was also adapted for television in 2006. It is the first of the Sally Lockhart Quartet. It is followed by The Shadow in the North, The Tiger in the Well and The Tin Princess. The book was also adapted for the stage at the Edinburgh Festival Fringe in August 2016.

TV adaptation

A TV film adaptation written by Adrian Hodges and starring Billie Piper was produced by the BBC. It aired on BBC One on 27 December 2006 and on PBS's Masterpiece Mystery! as The Sally Lockhart Mysteries: The Ruby in the Smoke on 4 February 2007. The UK broadcast attracted 7.07 million viewers. It is notable as marking the TV debut of actor Matt Smith, who would later take over the role of the Eleventh Doctor in Piper's former series, Doctor Who.

All four Sally Lockhart books were expected to be adapted for television; however, as of January 2015 no information has arisen regarding an adaptation of The Tiger in the Well.

Cast

Stage adaptation

In the summer of 2016, a stage adaptation written and directed by Madeleine Perham was performed at The Pleasance during the Edinburgh Fringe after receiving Pullman's blessing. Running for the month of August in the King Dome venue, the performance was hailed as a critical success, with the Scotsman stating that the show was 'a compelling tale, and full of surprises, moral ambiguities and people who are other than they seem'. Jane Berg from Three Weeks awarded the show five stars, stating that the show 'was one of the most enjoyable hours I’ve spent at this festival'. Broadway Baby, the local reviews website, stated that the show 'delighted in its Victorian setting' and was an 'excellent piece of storytelling', going on to award The Ruby in the Smoke four stars.

The show was created by new theatre company Reprint Productions (now Escapade), with a cast of six who multi-rolled the numerous characters in the show - Rebecca Lenihan, Sydney Austin, Tris Hobson, Martin Coates, Hamish Forbes and Madeleine Golding (who also served as producer and co-founder of Reprint).

References

External links
Tickets.edfringe.com (Advertisement for stage adaptation. Archive.org)
Pullman's page on the book (Archive.org)
Overview and background
Review of the book (written at the time of the BBC adaptation), Scotland on Sunday, 10 December 2006
BBC mini-site

1985 British novels
British young adult novels
Novels by Philip Pullman
BBC television dramas
Television shows based on British novels
Fiction set in 1872
Novels about orphans
Children's mystery novels
British novels adapted into films
1985 children's books
Oxford University Press books